Kairat Aubakirov (born 8 March 1971) is a retired Kazakh professional football player. He played for FC Shakhter Karagandy, FC Kairat, and FC Yelimay in the Kazakhstan Premier League, appearing in over 300 league matches, scoring almost 100 goals.

Aubakirov made nine appearances for the Kazakhstan national football team, scoring once.

Career statistics

International goals
Scores and results list. Kazakhstan's goal tally first.

References

External links
 

1971 births
Living people
Kazakhstani footballers
Kazakhstan international footballers
Kazakhstan Premier League players
FC Kairat players
FC Shakhter Karagandy players
FC Vostok players
FC Spartak Semey players
FC Taraz players
Association football forwards